The Avoca River is a river in the Canterbury region of New Zealand. It is a minor tributary of the Rakaia River via the Harper and Wilberforce Rivers, south of Arthur's Pass in Canterbury.

References

Rivers of Canterbury, New Zealand
Rivers of New Zealand